Basketball contests at the 1968 Summer Olympics was the seventh appearance of the sport of basketball as an official Olympic medal event. It took place at the Palacio de los Deportes in Mexico City, Mexico from October 13 to October 25, 1968. The United States defeated Yugoslavia to win their seventh straight gold medal in this sport, while the Soviet Union earned the bronze against Brazil.

Medal summary

Qualification
Automatic qualifications were granted to the host country and the first five places at the previous tournament. Additional spots were decided by various continental tournaments held by FIBA plus two additional tournaments that granted two extra berths each.

Format
 Two groups of eight teams are formed, where the top two from each group compete for the medals in a knockout round.
 The remaining places are defined as follows:
Fifth through eighth places are decided in a separate bracket between the third and fourth places from each group in a separate bracket.
Ninth through sixteenth places are decided between the fifth through eighth places from each group in separate brackets.

Squads
For the team rosters see: Basketball at the 1968 Summer Olympics – Men's team rosters.

Preliminary round
The top two teams from each group advance to the semifinals, while the remaining teams compete for 5th through 16th places in separate brackets. Both group leaders, the United States and the Soviet Union advanced undefeated to the knockout stage.

Group A

October 13

October 14

October 15

October 16

October 18

October 19

October 20

Group B

October 13

October 14

October 15

October 16

October 18

October 19

October 20

Knockout stage  
The much anticipated final between The United States and the USSR would have to wait four years.  Yugoslavia stunned the Soviets 63-62 in the semifinals.   In the championship game the Americans had a slim 32-29 lead at intermission  but put the game out of reach with a 22-3 streak to start the second half.

Medal bracket

Classification brackets
5th–8th Place

9th–12th Place

13th–16th Place

Awards

Final standings

References

External links
Official Olympic Report

 
1968 Summer Olympics events
1968
Olympics